"I Never Knew (What That Song Meant Before)" is a single by American country music artist Connie Smith. Released in June 1974, the song reached #13 on the Billboard Hot Country Singles chart. The song was issued onto Smith's second 1974 studio release that went by the same name. The single became Smith's second major hit single under Columbia Records.

Chart performance

References 

1974 singles
Connie Smith songs
Songs written by Sanger D. Shafer
1974 songs
Columbia Records singles
Song recordings produced by Ray Baker (music producer)